Peter Hugo McClure (August 19, 1947) is a British artist, poet and architect who is classified as a Geometric abstractionist.

History
Peter was born in an RAF hospital in Venice, Italy to a Scottish Father and Serbian Mother.

He studied Art and Architecture at Waltham Forest Technical College, and Art at Ealing.  He is best known for geometric art which has influenced furniture design, and featured on book covers and in magazines.

McClure’s fascination for magic squares, prime numbers, the golden ratio and geometry has driven much of his artwork.

McClure is currently living and working on the Kintyre peninsula.

The Millhouse Gallery
In 1989, McClure took over the running of the Millhouse restaurant in Penzance and converted it into a mini arts centre as a gallery venue for chess and the arts.

As the first and only vegan restaurant in Penzance at the time, it became a magnet for local and international celebrities including Jonathan Guinness, 3rd Baron Moyne and Susan (Shoe) Taylor who were regular visitors.

Galleries and locations exhibiting his work
Roberts & Margari Trust, North Virginia
Arnold Ashkenazy Foundation, Los Angeles, USA
Shoe Taylor / Jonathan Guinness Trust, Cornwall / Ireland
Unity Church, Irvine, Orange County, USA
Far North Regional Museum, Kataia, New Zealand
Serbian Church, Ladbrooke Grove, London
Bridgeman Art Library, Westbourne Grove, London
Taipa Area School, Far North, New Zealand
Sara Rudman Collection, Penzance, Cornwall
"District & Urban" Enterprises, Westbourne Grove, London
Keeping It Local, Campbeltown, Scotland
Tyler Gallery, Mousehole, Cornwall, UK
Wetherspoons Restaurant / Gallery, St. Ives, Cornwall

Exhibitions
Google Plus 
Castle Gallery, West Kensington, London - exhibition of photographs - November 1980
St, Ives Public Library, Cornwall - April 1985
Penzance Art Centre - April/May 1985
H.S. Galerie, Heidelberg, F.R.D. - May 1985, 
Galerija Zel, Belgrade, Yugoslavia June 1985
Koetshuis Kunst Galerie, Amsterdam, Holland Late June 1985
International Photo Exposition, Belgrade, Oct.1985, 
Kunsthaus, W. Welker, Heidelberg, F.R.D. - April 1986 
Catania Opera House, Scicily - Sept. 1991 
Studio Gallery, Sky Park Circle, Irvine, California, USA March 1993
Bakehouse Gallery, Penzance - Oct. 1996
Penzer Gallery, Bread St. Penzannce, Cornwall - March 1997
Far North Gallery, Kaitaia, N.Z. - Dec. 1999
Taipa Beach Hotel, Far North, New Zealand - 2000
Far North Regional Museum Summer 2001
Local Council Gallery, Oneroa, Waiheke Island, New Zealand - Jan. 2001
The Garage Studio, Lamorna, Cornwall - Aug/Sep 2002
Chy Gwella, House of Healing, Penzance - Oct. 2005
Lamorna Village Hall, Nr. Penzance - Aug. 2006
St.Ives Arts Club, Cornwall - Oct. 2010 
Mounts Bay Contemporary, Western Promenade, Penzance, Cornwall - 2012
Central Library, Hartlepool - April 2013
Chelsea Art Fair, Summer 2017
The Tyler Gallery, Mousehole, Cornwall - 2017

References

External links
 Artist profile on Fine Art America
 Artist profile on Geoform

1947 births
Living people
Abstract painters